Canada, which is represented by the Canadian Olympic Committee (COC), has competed at the 2011 Pan American Games in Guadalajara, Mexico from October 14 to 30, 2011. The Canadian team was made up of 492 athletes (256 men and 236 women), the most ever for a non-home Games. On the team all ten provinces and the Northwest Territories are represented. Some sports such as wrestling have sent their strongest team, however sports which offer the most medals (badminton and athletics) have sent for the most part a developmental team. Table Tennis player Anqi Luo (15 years old) was Canada's youngest athlete at the Games while Equestrian athlete Ian Millar (64 years old) was Canada's eldest athlete competing in Guadalajara. Canada has competed in 35 out of the 36 sports on the program (the exception being basque pelota). On October 4, 2011, women's football star Christine Sinclair was selected to carry the flag during the opening ceremony. The chef de mission was Jacques Cardyn and the assistant chef de mission was Curt Harnett.

Canada was the host of the next games in 2015 in Toronto.

Medallists

Archery

Canada has qualified a full team of six athletes (three men and three women).
The team was officially announced on September 15.

Men's

Women

Athletics

Canada will be sending a team of seventeen athletes (six male and eleven female). According to the coach of the Canadian team Les Gramantik the team will not be the best available, "due to scheduling it is very difficult to send all of our best athletes."

Men

Women

Badminton

Canada as the top ranked nation in the Pan American Badminton Confederation, has qualified eight athletes (four men and four women. The official team was announced on September 26.

Men

Women

Mixed

Baseball

By finishing sixth at the 2010 Pan American Games qualifying tournament Canada has qualified a baseball team, for the first time since 1999. The team will be made up of twenty-four athletes and was announced on September 16.

Team

Group B

Semifinals

Gold medal match

Basketball

Canada has automatically qualified a men's and women's basketball teams. Each team will be made up of twelve athletes for a total of twenty-four. The teams selected were from the national developmental team.

Men

The roster was announced on October 4.

Roster

 Boris Bakovic
 Kyle Desmarais
 Tyson Hinz
 Cole Hobin
 Jahmal Jones
 Owen Klassen
 Michael Lieffers
 Lien Phillip
 Phil Scrubb
 Warren Ward
 Nathan Yu

Group A

Fifth place match

Women

The roster was announced on October 4.

Roster

 Taijah Campbell
 Justine Colley
 Paige Crozon
 Jill Humbert
 Alex Kiss-Rusk
 Lindsay Ledingham
 Megan Pinske
 Raelyn Prince
 Isidora Purkovic
 Kellie Ring
 Kadie Riverin
 Emma Wolfram

Group B

Fifth place match

Beach volleyball

Canada has qualified a men's and's women's pairs, by virtue of being in the top ten in each gender of the NORCECA beach volleyball rankings. The Canadian team was announced on September 9, 2011.

Men

Women

Bowling

Canada has qualified a full team of two men and two women The team was announced on October 4, 2011.

Men
Individual

Pairs

Women
Individual

Pairs

Boxing

Canada has qualified seven boxers. The team was announced on October 4.

Men

Women

Canoeing

Canada has qualified a full team of sixteen athletes. The final team was announced on October 4.

Men

Women

Cycling

Canada has qualified to send seventeen athletes in all four disciplines.

Road cycling
Men

Women

Track cycling
Men

Sprints & Pursuit

Omnium

Mountain biking
Men

Women

BMX
Men

Diving

Canada will send eight divers to compete.

Men

Women

Equestrian

Dressage
Canada has qualified a full dressage team.

Eventing
Canada has named a squad of five athletes in eventing.

Jumping
Canada has named a squad of four athletes in jumping.

Individual

Team

Fencing

Canada has qualified a team of sixteen athletes (nine men and seven women).

Men

Women

Field hockey

Canada has qualified a men's and women's field hockey team. Each team will be made up of sixteen athletes for a total of thirty-two.

Men

Canada's men's field hockey team are the defending Pan American Games champion, and have been drawn to play against Chile, Trinidad and Tobago and Barbados. The team was announced on September 21.

Team

 David Carter
 Adam Froese
 Jagdish Gill
 Matthew Guest
 Richard Hildreth
 David Jameson
 Antoni Kindler
 Mark Pearson
 Ken Pereira
 Keegan Pereira
 Rob Short
 Gabbar Singh
 Iain Smythe
 Scott Tupper
 Jesse Watson
 Philip Wright

Pool A

Semi-finals

Gold medal match

Women

Canada's women's field hockey have been drawn to play against defending Pan American Games champion Argentina, Trinidad and Tobago and Barbados. Canada's roster was named on August 19. The roster includes three returning members of the team that placed fifth at the 2007 Pan American Games in Rio de Janeiro.

Team

 Abigail Raye
 Azelia Liu
 Danielle Hennig
 Diana Roemer
 Hannah Haughn
 Jessalyn Walkey
 Kate Gillis
 Katie Baker
 Kaitlyn Williams
 Kristine Wishart
 Natalie Sourisseau
 Samantha Smith
 Sara McManus
 Stephanie Jameson
 Thea Culley
 Tyla Flexman

Pool A

Semi-finals

Bronze medal match

Football

Women

Canada has qualified a women's football team and it will consist of 18 athletes. Canada drew defending champions Brazil, Costa Rica and Argentina. The team was officially announced on September 26.

Team

 Rachelle Beanlands
 Melanie Booth
 Candace Chapman
 Robyn Gayle
 Christina Julien
 Kaylyn Kyle
 Karina LeBlanc
 Vanessa Legault-Cordisco
 Diana Matheson
 Kelly Parker
 Sophie Schmidt
 Desiree Scott
 Lauren Sesselmann
 Diamond Simpson
 Christine Sinclair
 Brittany Timko
 Rhian Wilkinson
 Shannon Woeller

Group B

Semifinals

Gold medal match

Gymnastics

Artistic
Canada has qualified a full team of six men and six women. Canada's men's team will be a B team.

Men

Individual qualification & Team Finals

Individual Finals

Women
Canada will send six women artistic gymnasts.

Individual qualification & Team Finals

Individual Finals

Rhythmic
Canada has qualified a full team of eight gymnasts (six in group and two in individual) in rhythmic gymnastics.

Individual

Group

Trampoline

Canada has qualified a full team of four gymnasts in trampoline (two male and two female).

Men

Women

Handball

Canada has qualified a men's team of 15 athletes.

Men

Canada has drawn defending champions, Brazil, Chile and Venezuela.

Team

 Zoran Bazdar
 Douglas Bennett
 
 Geoffroy Bessette Colette
 Daniel Devlin
 Niklas Etter
 Sébastien Fyfe
 Sylvain Gaudet
 Maxime Godin
 Ryan Homsy
 Jonathan Leduc
 Sean Phillips
 Xavier Roesch
 Danny St‐Laurent
 Mark Walder

Group A

Fifth-Eighth place matches

Fifth place match

Judo

Canada had originally qualified 13 judokas, the only category not qualifying was the +100 kg men. However, when the team was announced the 48 kg and +78 kg quotas for women were declined, therefore the team will be made up of eleven athletes.

Men

Repechage Rounds

Women

Repechage Rounds

Karate

Canada has qualified two male athletes and two female athletes.

Men

Women

Modern pentathlon

Canada has qualified a full team of 4 athletes (2 men and 2 women).

Men

Women

Racquetball

Canada has qualified a full racquetball team of 8 athletes (4 men and 4 women).

Men

Women

Roller skating

Canada has qualified a women's speed and artistic team, it will consist of 3 athletes.

Men

Women

Artistic

Rowing

Canada has qualified 22 athletes. The team is considered a "B" team as the group includes young and upcoming athletes with potential.

Men

Women

Rugby sevens

Canada has qualified a team, it will consist of 12 athletes.

Roster

 Nanyak Dala
 Sean Duke
 Matthew Evans
 Sean White
 Ciaran Hearn
 Nathan Hirayama
 Tyler Ardon
 Phil Mack
 John Moonlight
 Taylor Paris
 Mike Scholz
 Conor Trainor

Quarterfinals

Semifinals

Gold medal match

Sailing

Canada has qualified 7 boats and 13 athletes.

Men

Women

Open

Shooting

The Canadian shooting federation named a team of 18 athletes (ten male and eight female) to compete at the 2011 Pan American Games.

Men

Women

Softball

Canada has qualified a softball team. The team will be made up of 17 athletes. The final roster was named on August 16, 2011. The team will also include seven officials.

Team

 Jenna Caira
 Jocelyn Cater
 Erin Cumpstone
 Heather Ebert
 Kelsey Haberl
 Victoria Hayward
 Ashley Lanz
 Danielle Lopez
 Joey Lye
 Melanie Matthews
 Sarah Phillips
 Kaleigh Rafter
 Jillian Russell
 Jennifer Salling
 Hannah Schwarz
 Megan Timpf
 Jennifer Yee

Standings
The top four teams will advance to the semifinal round.

Results
Preliminary round

Semifinals

Gold Medal Match

Squash

Canada has qualified a full squash team. The team will be made up of six athletes (three men and three women).

Men

Team

Women

Team

Swimming

Canada's swim team will be made up of athletes who finish in the two in each event (and meet qualifying standards) at the 2011 Summer National Championships in Pointe-Claire, Quebec. Canada's swimming team is considered a 'B' or a developmental team, because the selection trials were held during the 2011 World Aquatics Championships in Shanghai, China where most of Canada's top swimmers were competing.

Canada's team was announced on August 22, 2011, it will consist of 21 athletes (14 females and 7 males). Majority of the swimmers who won the races they competed in at the selection trials (including former world record holder Amanda Reason) declined to participate.

Men

* Swimmers who participated in the heats only and received medals.

Women

* Swimmers who participated in the heats only and received medals.

Synchronized swimming

Canada has qualified a full team (a duet and a team) it will consist of nine athletes.

Table tennis

Canada has qualified a full team of 3 male and 3 female athletes.

Men
Individual

Team

Women
Individual

Team

Taekwondo

Canada has qualified a full team of eight athletes. The team was selected after selection trials held between July 30 and 31, 2011 in Toronto, Ontario. A notable exclusion is Karine Sergerie (lost her final bout at the qualification tournament) who was a silver medalist at the 2008 Summer Olympics in Beijing, China

Men

Women

Tennis

Canada has qualified two tennis players (one male and one female), all two are ranked well below the top ranked athletes in Canada.

Men

Women

Mixed Doubles

Triathlon

Canada had qualified a full triathlon team of six athletes, however only three athletes were announced to the team.

Men

Women

Volleyball

Canada has qualified a men's and's women's teams.

Men
The men's team will consist of eleven athletes.
Roster

 Blair Bann
 Max Burt
 Reid Halpenny
 Jacob Kilpatrick
 Spencer Leiske
 Louis-Pierre Mainville
 Kevin Miller
 Tanner Nault
 Devon Parkinson
 Sander Ratsep
 Tyler Santoni

Group B

Fifth to eighth place classification

Fifth place match

Women
The women's team will consist of twelve athletes.

Team

 Carla Bradstock
 Elizabeth Cordonier
 Jennifer Hinze
 Sherline Tasha Holness
 Colette Johnson
 Tammy Mahon
 Tricia Mayba
 Ciaran McGovern
 Tonya Mokelki
 Lauren O'Reilly
 Brittney Page
 Julie Young

Group A

Fifth to eighth place classification

Seventh place match

Water polo

Canada has qualified a men's and women's water polo team. Each team will be made up of 13 athletes for a total of 26.

Men

Canada has been drawn into a group with Colombia, Cuba and hosts Mexico. Canada are the defending silver medalists from 2007.

Team

 Dusan Aleksic
 Nicholas Bicari
 Justin Boyd
 John Conway
 Dusko Dakic
 Devon Diggle
 Aaron Feltham
 Kevin Graham
 Constantine Kudaba
 Jared McElroy
 Robin Randall
 Scott Robinson
 Oliver Vikalo

Group A

Semifinals

Gold medal match

Women

Canada has been drawn into a group with Brazil, Mexico and hosts Venezuela. Canada are the defending silver medalists from 2007.

Team

 Krystina Alogbo
 Joëlle Békhazi
 Tara Campbell
 Emily Csikos
 Monika Eggens
 Whitney Genoway
 Katrina Monton
 Dominique Perreault
 Marina Radu
 Rachel Riddell
 Christine Robinson
 Rosanna Tomiuk
 Anna Yelizarova

Group A

Semifinals

Gold medal match

Water skiing

Canada has qualified a full team of 5 athletes (men, women and wakeboard). The team was officially announced on October 4.

Men

Women

Weightlifting

Canada has qualified a team of two male and one female athlete. The team was announced on October 4.

Men

Women

Wrestling

Canada has qualified full female team of four athletes and a full men's freestyle team of seven athletes, as well as three male Greco-Roman wrestlers. Canada's team will include five defending medalists including defending gold medalist and Olympic Champion, Carol Huynh.

Men's Freestyle

Greco-Roman

Women's Freestyle

References

Nations at the 2011 Pan American Games
P
2011